The Alfred P. Sloan Foundation Feature Film Prize award of $25,000.00 USD was granted annually at the Hamptons International Film Festival from 2000 to 2014 by the Alfred P. Sloan Foundation.

References
 

Alfred P. Sloan Foundation